Mayberry Machiavelli is a satirically pejorative phrase coined by John J. DiIulio Jr., a former George W. Bush administration staffer who ran the President's Faith-Based Initiative. After DiIulio resigned from his White House post in late 2001, journalist Ron Suskind quoted him in an Esquire magazine article describing the administration of the Bush White House as follows: "What you've got is everything—and I mean everything—being run by the political arm. It's the reign of the Mayberry Machiavellis." In a 2002 letter to Suskind (but not published until 2007), DiIulio wrote that the "Mayberry Machiavellis" were the junior and senior staffers who reduced every issue to a simplistic black and white, us vs them narrative.

The phrase invokes the infamous Machiavellian-style power politics coupled with the simplistic mindset of a rural small town, as exemplified by the fictional town of Mayberry in the television shows The Andy Griffith Show and Mayberry R.F.D., which ran on the American television network CBS from 1960 to 1971.

References

Presidency of George W. Bush
American political catchphrases